is a Japanese manga artist who is especially known for his adaptations of literary works by American writer H. P. Lovecraft. His manga have been translated into English, French, German, Spanish and Italian.

Career 
In the Q4 2005, in the midst of non productive period, he was exploring new ideas for "stories about monsters with no positive outcome". His publisher introduced him to the Cthulhu Mythos by Howard Phillips Lovecraft. In a subsequent interview with CNews2, Tanabe said how he was impressed by characters who "lose all hope and appetite for life. It is this common thread in Lovecraft's stories that particularly struck me".

In 2012, he drew an adaptation of Mr. Nobody in Monthly Comic Ryū and it was also subsequently published in a three bound volumes by publisher Tokuma Shoten.

In 2015, he drew Lovecraft's  in Comic Beam, which was published by Enterbrain.

On March 12, 2021, he completed Lovecraft's .

Bibliography

Adaptations of Lovecraft's works

Series 
 
 Volume 1, 2010
 Volume 2, 2010

 Mr. Nobody
 Volume 1, 2014
 Volume 2, 2014
 Volume 3, 2014

See also
 Cthulhu Mythos in popular culture

References

1975 births
Living people
Manga artists from Tokyo
People from Tokyo